The following is a list of clubs who have played in the Northern Counties East Football League since its formation in 1982 to the current season.

Current clubs

Premier Division
Albion Sports
Barton Town
Bottesford Town
Eccleshill United
Emley
Frickley Athletic
Garforth Town
Golcar United
Goole
Hallam
Handsworth
Hemsworth Miners Welfare
Knaresborough Town
Maltby Main
North Ferriby
Penistone Church
Silsden
Thackley
Winterton Rangers
Yorkshire Amateur

Division One
Armthorpe Welfare
Athersley Recreation
Beverley Town
Brigg Town
Campion
Clipstone
Glasshoughton Welfare
Hall Road Rangers
Harrogate Railway Athletic
Horbury Town
Nostell Miners Welfare
Ollerton Town
Parkgate
Retford
Rossington Main
Selby Town
Shirebrook Town
Staveley Miners Welfare
Swallownest
Wakefield
Worsbrough Bridge Athletic

Former clubs

 Alfreton Town    
 Appleby Frodingham
 Arnold
 Arnold Kingswell
 Arnold Town
 Askern
 Basford United
 Belper Town
 Bentley Victoria Welfare
 Blidworth Welfare
 FC Bolsover
 Borrowash Victoria
 Boston Town
 Bradley Rangers
 Bridlington Trinity
 Brighouse Town
 Brodsworth Welfare
 Brook Sports
 Buxton
 Carlton Town
 Cleethorpes Town
 Clipstone
 Collingham
 Creswell Colliery
 Curzon Ashton
 Denaby United
 Dinnington Town
 Eastwood Town
 Emley (1903)
 Farsley
 Farsley Celtic
 Frecheville Community Association
 Fryston Colliery Welfare
 Gedling Town
 Glapwell
 Graham Street Prims
 Grimethorpe Miners Welfare
 Guisborough Town
 Guiseley
 Handsworth (2003)
 Harrogate Town
 Harworth Colliery
 Hatfield Main
 Heanor Town
 Hucknall Rolls Royce
 Hucknall Town
 FC Humber United
 Hull United
 Ilkeston Town
 Immingham Town
 Kimberley Town
 Kiveton Park
 Leeds Ashley Road
 Leeds Carnegie
 Lincoln Moorlands Railway
 Lincoln United
 Long Eaton Grange
 Long Eaton United
 Louth Town
 Louth United
 Mexborough Town
 Mickleover Sports
 North Ferriby United
 North Shields
 Norton Woodseats
 Oakham United
 Ossett Albion
 Ossett Town
 Phoenix Park
 Pickering Town
 Pilkington Recreation
 Pontefract Collieries
 Rainworth Miners Welfare
 Retford Rail
 Retford Town
 Retford United
 Rowntree Mackintosh
 Scarborough Athletic
 Shaw Lane
 Sheffield
 Shepshed Charterhouse
 Shirebrook Town
 South Normanton Athletic
 Spalding United
 Spennymoor United
 Staveley Works
 Stocksbridge Park Steels
 Stocksbridge Works
 Sutton Town
 Sutton Trinity
 Tadcaster Albion
 Teversal
 Thorne Colliery
 Westella & Willerby
 Wombwell Sports Association
 Woolley Miners Welfare
 Worksop Town
 York Railway Institute
 Yorkshire Main

References

Northern Counties East Football Clubs